Fuad Rahimi (born 11 April 1998) is a professional footballer who plays as a defender for Liechtenstein club Vaduz. Born in Switzerland, Rahimi is a youth international for Kosovo.

Career
Rahimi began his senior career with Wil, before joining Vaduz on 14 January 2020. Rahimi made his professional debut with Vaduz in a 1-1 Swiss Super League tie with FC Lugano on 17 October 2020. After establishing himself in the first team, he signed a new 2-year contract in November 2021.

References

External links

SFL Profile
Bild Profile

1998 births
Sportspeople from the canton of St. Gallen
Living people
Kosovan footballers
Kosovo youth international footballers
Swiss men's footballers
Swiss people of Kosovan descent
Association football defenders
FC Vaduz players
FC Wil players
Swiss Super League players
Swiss Challenge League players
Kosovan expatriate footballers
Swiss expatriate footballers
Kosovan expatriates in Liechtenstein
Swiss expatriates in Liechtenstein
Expatriate footballers in Liechtenstein